The Wur or Wara, meaning small, little or minor, also known as Wur Mamund or Wara Mamund, meaning small, little or minor Mamund or descendants/offspring/children of small, little, minor Mamund, are a Pashtun group. They are a division of the Mamund clan, which is itself part of the larger Tarkani tribe. The Wur are mainly settled in Bajaur Agency in Pakistan, but originally hailed from the Laghman province of Afghanistan.

They live in Umaray, Sewai, Damadola, Badan, Tani and Kamar villages of Tehsil Mamund, Bajaur Agency, Pakistan and also in Marawara and Shortan areas of Kunar Province, Afghanistan.

Sub-divisions of Wur or Wara Pashtuns

References

Sarbani Pashtun tribes
Bajaur Agency
People from Bajaur District
Ethnic groups in Laghman Province
Ethnic groups in Kunar Province